Rochelle High School or Rochelle School is a public high school located in unincorporated Rochelle, Texas (USA) and classified as a 1A school by the UIL. It is part of the Rochelle Independent School District located in eastern McCulloch County. In 2015, the school was rated "Met Standard" by the Texas Education Agency.

Athletics
The Rochelle Hornets compete in these sports 

Basketball
Cross Country
6-Man Football
Golf
Tennis
Track and Field

State Titles
Girls' Track - 
2008(1A), 2009(1A)

Rochelle is notable for winning the 2008 and 2009 Class A girls' state track titles, based on the strength of Texas A&M University signee Bonnie Richardson, who was the school's only state qualifier in 2008 and the sole member of the girls' track team in 2009.

References

External links
Rochelle ISD
List of Six-man football stadiums in Texas

Schools in McCulloch County, Texas
Public high schools in Texas